Psaltoda is a genus of cicada found in eastern Australia. Originally described by Carl Stål, the type species is Psaltoda moerens known as the redeye, and P. plaga is a well-known species from eastern Australia, known as the black prince.  Fifteen species are recognised. Relationships of the species with each other remains unclear.

Species
 Psaltoda adonis Ashton, 1914 - forest demon
 Psaltoda antennetta Moulds, 2002 - clubbed sage
 Psaltoda aurora Distant, 1881 - red roarer
 Psaltoda brachypennis Moss and Moulds, 2000 - phantom knight
 Psaltoda claripennis Ashton, 1921 - clanger
 Psaltoda flavescens Distant, 1892 - golden knight
 Psaltoda fumipennis Ashton, 1912 - smoky sage
 Psaltoda harrisii (Leach, 1814) - yellowbelly
 Psaltoda insularis Ashton, 1914
 Psaltoda maccallumi Moulds, 2002
 Psaltoda magnifica Moulds, 1984 - green baron
 Psaltoda moerens (Germar, 1834) - redeye
 Psaltoda mossi, Moulds, 2002 - little baron
 Psaltoda pictibasis (Walker, 1858) - black friday
 Psaltoda plaga (Walker, 1850) - black prince

References

Psaltodini
Hemiptera of Australia
Cicadidae genera
Taxa named by Carl Stål